Badia a Montemuro (or Badiaccia a Montemuro) is a village in Tuscany, central Italy, administratively a frazione of the comune of Radda in Chianti, province of Siena. At the time of the 2001 census its population was 26.

Badia a Montemuro is about 40 km from Siena and 14 km from Radda in Chianti.

References 

Frazioni of Radda in Chianti